Henry Constantine Huxtable (8 March 1826 – 1871) was Bishop of Mauritius from 1870 to August 1871.

References

1826 births
Alumni of King's College London
Anglican bishops of Mauritius
1871 deaths
British Mauritius people